The FIS Alpine World Ski Championships 1974 were held in St. Moritz, Switzerland, at Piz Nair from February 3–10, 1974.

St. Moritz hosted again in 2003, and the event is scheduled to return in 2017. It also hosted the Winter Olympics in 1948 and 1928 (no alpine skiing).

Men's competitions

Downhill
Saturday, 9 February

Giant Slalom
Tuesday, 5 February

Slalom
Sunday, 10 February

Combined
At the World Championships from 1954 through 1980, the combined was a "paper race" using the results of the three events (DH, GS, SL).

Women's competitions

Downhill
Thursday, 7 February

Giant Slalom
Sunday, 3 February

Slalom
Friday, 8 February

Combined
At the World Championships from 1954 through 1980, the combined was a "paper race" using the results of the three events (DH, GS, SL).

Medals table

See also
 Italy at the FIS Alpine World Ski Championships 1974

References

External links
FIS-ski.com - results 1974 World Championships - St. Moritz, Switzerland
FIS-ski.com - results - World Championships

FIS Alpine World Ski Championships
1974
A
Sport in St. Moritz
1974 in Swiss sport
Alpine skiing competitions in Switzerland
February 1974 sports events in Europe